Dinesh Abeywickrama (born January 1, 1983) is a Sri Lankan IT strategist, researcher and author. He is a Member of British Computer Society and currently working as an executive officer at the Capital Maharaja Organization.

Early life and family 
Born to a middle-class family in the suburbs of Colombo he received his school education at Bandaranayake College, Gampaha. Dinesh's father, Sunil Abeywickrama, was a government clerk, while his mother Mala Abeywickrama was a grade one officer at Sri Lanka Insurance.

Education 
Dinesh is a degree holder from the British Computer Society, holds a Master's in Business Management from the Cardiff Metropolitan University. Then he is doing his Ph.D. in Business Management from Management and Science University, Malaysia.

Research 
Dinesh Abeywickrama has made many contributions to the ICT field, publishing several scientific papers and articles in peer-reviewed journals, some of which are archived at Oxford University Press.
His Green Banking research was awarded at the International Multidisciplinary Research Conference 2016.

Research articles

Controversial Calligraphies

Mobile apps 
Dinesh has created 02 mobile applications.
 Laksara online radio app
 U-report citizen journalism mobile app

References 

1983 births
Living people
Sinhalese academics
People from Gampaha District
Sri Lankan computer scientists
People from Colombo
Sri Lankan business executives
Sri Lankan male writers